Rakesh Ranjan Prasad (July 1955 — 3 June 2018) was an Indian Judge and former Chief Justice of Manipur High Court.

Career
Prasad was born in 1955 in Bihar. He graduated in Science and passed LL.B. from Patna Law College. Prasad was enrolled as an Advocate in Bihar State Bar Council in 1980 and started practice on Civil, Criminal and Constitutional matters in the Patna High Court. On 6 May 1991 he joined  Superior Judicial Service and was appointed Additional District Judge. He was promoted to District and Sessions Judge in 2001. 

Prasad became Registrar General of Jharkhand High Court on 9 June 2001. On 9 February 2006 he was appointed a Judge of Jharkhand High Court thereafter transferred to Manipur High Court on 1 February 2016. Justice Prasad also took charge of the Acting Chief Justice of Manipur High Court after Justice Laxmi Kanta Mohapatra. On 22 September 2016 he became the permanent Chief Justice of the Manipur High Court. Prasad retired on 30 June 2017 from the judgeship.

References

1955 births
Indian judges
Judges of the Jharkhand High Court
Judges of the Manipur High Court
Chief Justices of Manipur High Court
21st-century Indian lawyers
21st-century Indian judges
People from Bihar
2018 deaths